The 2018 Spanish Indoor Athletics Championships was the 54th edition of the annual indoor track and field competition organised by the Royal Spanish Athletics Federation (RFEA), which serves as the Spanish national indoor championship for the sport. A total of 26 events (divided evenly between the sexes) were contested over two days on 17 and 18 February at the Luis Puig Palace in Valencia, Valencian Community.

Óscar Husillos set a Spanish indoor record of 20.68 seconds in the men's 200 metres semi-final.

Results

Men

Women

References

Results
LIII Campeonato de España Absoluto en Pista Cubierta . RFEA. Retrieved 2020-03-10.

External links
Official website for the Royal Spanish Athletics Federation

Spanish Indoor Athletics Championships
Spanish Indoor Athletics Championships
Spanish Indoor Athletics Championships
Spanish Indoor Athletics Championships
Sports competitions in Valencia